Cyperus granitophilus, commonly known as the granite flatsedge, is a species of sedge that is native to southern parts of North America.

See also
List of Cyperus species

References

granitophilus
Plants described in 1937
Flora of Alabama
Flora of Georgia (U.S. state)
Flora of North Carolina
Flora of South Carolina
Flora of Oklahoma
Flora of Texas
Flora of Tennessee
Flora of Virginia
Taxa named by Rogers McVaugh
Flora without expected TNC conservation status